Colonel  William Tayloe also known as William Teylow, was a British immigrant, colonist, and planter, from Gloucester, England, who emigrated to the British Colony of Virginia and resided in York County. His coat of arms, Vert a sword erect Or between two lions rampant addorsed Ermine, matches those of Teylow in Gloucester, England.

Family History

The earliest record of the name "Telowe" is from a document dated 1292 during the reign of Edward I regarding a Henry Telowe during an Inquisition of Henry De Dene (de Dene refers to Forest of Dean and later mentioned in de Dene's care is St Briavels Castle, it reads:
	
"Inquisition made on Monday next after the feast of St. Gregory the Pope, 20 Edw. I [1292] by Richard de Gorstleye, John Geffery, Henry son of Stephen, Henry Telow, Walter son of Nicholas, William de Crickesfend, John de Dene, Nicholas Scharlemayn, Robert son of Genry Glynt, Thomas and Hugh de Biddleslowe, of that land and tenements which Henry de Dene held of the King in chief on the day that he died.."

The earliest record of the name "Teylowe" is from a document dated 1 August 1420 for a Richard Teylowe, juror for the inquisition of "Joan, Widow of Roger Vynour". On 27 October 1442 a "John Teylowe: chaplain, querents" was party to land transaction in Hereford, England. In 1443 John Teylowe was a juror in the inquisition of Robert Whitney, Knight, dated 4 April. On 3 May 1452, Robert Hychys and his wife Alice release to Philip Teylowe, son of Alice, all of their rights to a piece of land in the parish of Newland near Lamscoy. In 1454–1455 a John Teylowe was an apprentice to Henry Frowyke. In 1466 Agnes Teylowe initiates a Quit-Claim of "Heymedow in Newland, late the relic of Philip Barbour, in pure widowhood, to James Hwett...within the parishes of Newlond and Stanton. This estate, later be known as "High Meadow," would be sold on 7 April 1516 by John Teylowe through a "Feoffment" to Henry Hall  and then to Thomas Gage, 1st Viscount Gage through his marriage to heiress Benedicta Maria Theresa Hall.

There is record of a John Teylowe serving as Mayor in Hereford, England during the latter half of the reign of Edward IV circa 1471, again during the reign of Henry VII circa 1491, and again circa 1496.

The Name Tayloe 
The first record of the name Tayloe is from "The History and Antiquities of Gloucester: From the Earliest Period to the Present Time; Including an Account of the Abbey, Cathedral, and Other Religious Houses, with the Abbots, Bishops, and Dignitaries of Each, Voorkant, Thomas Rudge J. Wood, 1811. Where Thomas  "Tayloe" or Teylowe is recorded as Sheriff of Gloucester under Mayor Philip Pridith during the final days of the 15th Century and again in the early 1500s. A few years later he was Mayor in 1506, 1513 and, 1522.

Career
William was an early settler in York County, Virginia. On Feb 10, 1638, William Tayloe's land was mentioned as adjoining a patent to George Lobb, Thomas Pierce and Thomas Warner on the Chickahominy River in James City County VA. This means that William had arrived in the colony earlier than Feb 1638. On Nov 9, 1638, William Taylor patented 1200 acres on the Chichahominy River in James City County, Virginia, "beginning at the next point of land above Warrany Landing Place, W S[outh]ly upon the said river, E Nly into the main woods and Warrany Creek on the north, for the transportation of 24 persons.  

In or before 1640, he purchased from John Utie the estate called "Utiemaria" in the aforementioned county, but, it seems, did not long hold it. By a deed dated December 25, 1640, "William Tayloe of Utiemaria in the County of Charles River, in Virginia, merchant," sold to William Blackley, 100 acres of land which he had bought from John Utie, and on Jan. 7, 1641, he sold to Henry Corbell 1250 acres also purchased from Utie. In Apr 1642, William Taylor and Elizabeth Kingsmill "now the wife of William Taylor" granted a patent to John Jackson. Elizabeth had obtained the patent on Sep 26, 1638, with John Jackson for 600 acres in James City County VA "being a small parcel of islands up Chickahominy River [en]compassed round with a marsh, ... due by right of transportation of 12 persons." Col. William Tayloe, as he ultimately became, was a burgess for York County in March, 1642–43, and Nov., 1647. As Maj. William Tayloe, he was present as a member of the council, Nov. 6, 1651, but lost his seat on the surrender of Virginia to the parliament. He was, however, again elected a councilor, April 30, 1652, and once more on March 31, 1654–55. He had been a justice of York since 1647.

Marriage
Col. Tayloe married Elizabeth, daughter of Richard Kingsmill, of Virginia, and died without issue. His widow married secondly Nathaniel Bacon. The tomb of Mrs. Elizabeth Bacon, now in St. Paul's Churchyard, Norfolk, bears the Kingsmill and Tayloe arms.

Tayloe married Elizabeth Kingsmill, daughter of Richard Kingsmill a prominent member of the Virginia Company. Richard Kingsmil was the colonial customs inspector for the upper James River. Along the river, site of his inspection station, also featured a tavern, storehouse, warehouse, and ferry house. Quarterpath Road extended between Kingsmill Plantation, on the York River between King and Queen Creek, and Williamsburg. The Virginia Company was a for-profit organization chartered in England which was charged with the founding and settlement of Virginia under the reign of King James I. In 1619, Richard Kingsmill, William Fairfax, William Claiborne, John Jefferson, William Spence, Richard Staples, and Richard Brewster, were the first Virginia Company members to receive grants of land in what was later to become "Kingsmill." Richard Kingsmill, a member of the General Assembly, expanded his holdings to 750 acres. He and his wife, Jane, had one child, a daughter, Elizabeth (1634–1691) who married first William Tayloe (Teylow) and then Colonel Nathaniel Bacon. The Kingsmill land was passed down through them to their niece, Abigail Smith and her husband, Lewis Burwell II. 

They had no children. Following Tayloe's death, his widow married Nathaniel Bacon, cousin of Nathaniel Bacon. Elizabeth Bacon is buried in St. Paul's Churchyard, Norfolk and her grave shows the Kingsmill and Tayloe arms. Through his nephew, however, Colonel William Tayloe, of Richmond County, progenitor of the Tayloe's of Mount Airy, Richmond County, Virginia, he has numerous representatives in Virginia.

References

1599 births
1655 deaths
Tayloe family of Virginia